Jakarta BNI 46 (formerly Jakarta BNI Taplus) is a men's and women's volleyball team based in Jakarta, Indonesia. The team plays in Proliga. They had represented Indonesia in Men's and Women's AVC Club Championships in 2006 and 2010.

The team is fully owned by PT. Bank Negara Indonesia (Persero) Tbk., a state's owned company of the Government of the Republic of Indonesia. Since 2011, the manager for men's team is Endang Hidayatullah and for the women's team is Andan Kesuma.

Current roster
Season 2018–2019

Coach:  Risco Herlambang

Honours
Proliga
Champions (4): 2003, 2005, 2006, 2010
Runners-up (4): 2007, 2008, 2012, 2013
Asian Men's Club Volleyball Championship
Third place (1): 2006

Indonesian volleyball clubs
Volleyball clubs established in 2002
2002 establishments in Indonesia